Trinidad and Tobago operates under a two-tier healthcare system. That is, there is the existence of both private and public facilities. 

The Ministry of Health is responsible for leading the health sector. The service provision aspect of public healthcare has been devolved to newly created entities, the Regional Health Authorities (RHAs). Responsibility for the provision of healthcare services in Trinidad and Tobago was devolved from the Ministry of Health to Regional Health Authorities under the Regional Health Authorities Act No. 5 in 1994.  

While the Ministry of Health does not directly run health facilities, it is required to play a key role in ensuring that they are properly run, by setting policies, goals and targets for Regions based on assessment of real health needs. This is the main role of the Ministry of Health. The Ministry also allocates resources to the RHAs to finance their operations. The Ministry of Health is shifting its focus to concentrate on policy development, planning, monitoring and evaluation, regulation, financing and research. Citizens can access free health care at public healthcare facilities where health insurance is not required. However, the government is developing the National Health Service in which a package of services is to be determined, as well as a financing strategy.

Public and private
Public Healthcare is free to everyone in Trinidad and Tobago and is paid for by the Government and taxpayers. Healthcare services are provided on a walk-in basis. There are a few major hospitals throughout the country as well as smaller health centers and clinics located regionally throughout.

Several major hospitals in Trinidad and Tobago are:
Port of Spain General Hospital located in the country's capital of Port of Spain. It is a major trauma centre in the Caribbean.
San Fernando General Hospital located in the City of San Fernando.
San Fernando Teaching Hospital located in the City of San Fernando.
Sangre Grande Hospital located in Sangre Grande, Trinidad.
Point Fortin Hospital
Eric Williams Medical Science Complex located in Champ Fleurs, Trinidad.
Scarborough General Hospital located in Signal Hill, Tobago

These hospitals are aided by many DHF'S (District Health Facilities) located throughout the country.

Reform
The Ministry of Health is mandated to provide a functioning healthcare system to benefit all citizens. This had led to the reforming of the entire healthcare system in the country.

Recently, the government of Trinidad and Tobago has launched CDAP (Chronic Disease Assistance Programme). 	
The Chronic Disease Assistance Programme provides citizens with free prescription drugs and other pharmaceutical items to combat the following health conditions:
Diabetes
Asthma
Cardiac Diseases
Arthritis
Glaucoma
Mental Depression
High Blood Pressure
Benign Prostatic Hyperplasia (Enlarged Prostate)
Epilepsy
Hypercholesterolemia
Parkinson’s disease
Thyroid diseases

There are over 250 pharmacies throughout the country that provide medications through CDAP. All citizens of Trinidad & Tobago are eligible. There are no age restrictions or exceptions.

See also 
Health in Trinidad and Tobago
Universal healthcare

References

Health in Trinidad and Tobago